Nutter is a hamlet in the Dutch province of Overijssel. It is a part of the municipality of Dinkelland, and lies about 13 km north of Oldenzaal.

It was first mentioned in 1297 as Nuthere. The etymology is unclear. In 1840, it was home to 194 people. There are direction signs to Nutter, but no place name signs that you have arrived.

Gallery

References

Populated places in Overijssel
Dinkelland